Klooga may refer to:
Klooga, Estonia, a borough in Harju County, Estonia
Lake Klooga, a lake in Klooga, Estonia
Klooga concentration camp, a Nazi concentration camp (1943–1944)
Klooga training area, Estonian Defence Forces training area (2008–present)